Karl Otto Fazer (16 August 1866 – 9 October 1932) was a Finnish businessman and sport shooter.

Biography
He was born in Helsinki. He had four children and was the grandfather of Peter Fazer. His father, Eduard Peter Fazer (originally Fatzer), was a Swiss-born furrier.

Fazer studied baking in Berlin, Paris, and Saint Petersburg before becoming a pioneer of Finnish confectionery. Together with his wife Berta he opened a French-Russian confectionery at Glogatan (Kluuvikatu) 3 in Helsinki on 17 September 1891. Later he opened a chocolate and candy factory in Punavuori.

Fazer, the company he founded, is still in existence. Many of its products have become classic. This is particularly true of the "Fazer Blue" ("Fazerin Sininen" in Finnish, "Fazer blå" in Swedish), a brand of chocolate that is often compared to salmiakki, as a candy that is a part of the Finnish national identity.

Fazer established bird protection areas in the Åland archipelago and on the lands of the Taubila farm he bought in 1918 in Pyhäjärvi, Vyborg County, Karelia. He brought pheasants to Finland, and owned a pheasant farm near Helsinki at the beginning of the 20th century. 

Fazer died in 1932 at the age of 66 after suffering a heart attack on a hunting trip in Jokioinen.

1912 Olympics
Fazer was an excellent marksman, and he participated the Olympic Games in 1912 with the Finnish shooting team. He placed twelfth in men's trap and fifth in men's team clay pigeons.

References

External links
 

1866 births
1932 deaths
Sportspeople from Helsinki
People from Uusimaa Province (Grand Duchy of Finland)
Swedish-speaking Finns
Finnish people of Swiss descent
Finnish male sport shooters
19th-century Finnish businesspeople
Trap and double trap shooters
Olympic shooters of Finland
Shooters at the 1912 Summer Olympics
Fazer